Howsham may refer to:

 Howsham, Lincolnshire, England
 Howsham, North Yorkshire, England